The FREEDOM Support Act of 1992 (Freedom for Russia and Emerging Eurasian Democracies and Open Markets Support Act, FSA, HR 282) is an act passed by the United States Congress. It is not to be confused with the Iran Freedom and Support Act of 2005 (S 333).

Formation of the Act 

The bill H.R.4547 was sponsored by Rep Dante B. Fascell and introduced March 24, 1992. It was passed by the House on August 6, 1992.

The bill was introduced as S.2532 into the Senate on April 7, 1992, and sponsored by Sen Claiborne Pell. It passed the Senate on July 2, 1992.

The FSA was signed into law on October 24, 1992, by President George H. W. Bush and assigned Public Law No. 102 - 511

Provisions of the Act 

Created through the act are the U.S. Civilian Research & Development Foundation, the Armenia School Connectivity Program and other organizations founded to foster growth in the former Soviet Union.

Section 102 of the FREEDOM Support Act creates the position of a Coordinator within the Department of State.

In 1992, funding from the FREEDOM Support Act and USAID helped create American Business Centers (ABCs) under the United States Commercial Service, designed to operate in the developing markets of Russia and the Newly Independent States to stimulate economic growth and create jobs in the United States.

Section 907 specifically prohibits Azerbaijan from participating in programs created by the act.

See also
 Former Soviet Union Demilitarization Act of 1992
 FRIENDSHIP Act of 1993

References

External links
 History of U.S. Assistance to the New Independent States in the Clinton Administration on the State Department's Website
 
 

1992 in law
1992 in international relations
102nd United States Congress
United States foreign relations legislation
United States federal defense and national security legislation